The African Executive is a weekly opinion and business magazine published by the Inter Region Economic Network (IREN), located in Nairobi, Kenya. The magazine attracts international opinion writers to comment on Africa's socio-political and economic development.

History
The magazine was established in 2005 and traces its roots to James Shikwati's weekly opinion pieces that were circulated to subscribed list of members in 2001 - 2002. The weekly circulation of this opinion pieces was changed to an IREN Kenya Newsletter (2002 - 2005) which later transformed into The African Executive Magazine that accommodates wider opinion and reviews on issues about Africa.

References

External links
 The African Executive website
 Inter Region Economic Network

2005 establishments in Kenya
Business magazines
Magazines published in Kenya
Magazines established in 2005
Mass media in Nairobi
Weekly magazines